Brodingberg is a former municipality in the district of Graz-Umgebung in the Austrian state of Styria. Since the 2015 Styria municipal structural reform, it is part of the municipality Eggersdorf bei Graz.

Geography
Brodingberg lies about 15 km east of Graz on the Rabnitzbach, a tributary of the Raab.

References

Cities and towns in Graz-Umgebung District